Pöytä on katettu is the second studio album by Finnish band Elokuu. It was released on 22 May 2013. In its first week of release, the album peaked at number eight on the Finnish Album Chart.

Singles

Two singles were released; "Tänään lähtee", which peaked at number 12 on the Finnish Singles Chart, and "Valvoo".

Track listing

Chart performance

References

2013 albums
Finnish-language albums
Elokuu albums